Aqdash (also Romanized as Āqdāsh; also known as Āq Tāsh) is a village in Kabud Gonbad Rural District, in the Central District of Kalat County, Razavi Khorasan Province, Iran. At the 2006 census, its population was 612, in 147 families.

See also 

 List of cities, towns and villages in Razavi Khorasan Province

References 

Populated places in Kalat County